Orchard Park Secondary School is located at 200 DeWitt Road, Stoney Creek, Ontario and has a 2009–10 enrolment of 1220.  The school opened in 1966 and is a member of the Hamilton-Wentworth District School Board.  Orchard Park Secondary School uses the Ontario Secondary School Literacy Test (OSSLT) to assess Grade 10 students' skills in reading and writing. Successful completion of the test is one of 32 requirements students need to attain in order to receive an  Ontario Secondary School Diploma.  The school also has a special education program and offers co-operative education.

Program specialization
Orchard Park Secondary School offers specialized programs for students with certain areas of interest.  Specialized courses include: Hospitality & Tourism, Robotics, Basketball Academy, Football Academy and Cosmetology & Fashion.  Specialized programs are intended to help students gain access to post secondary education in a specific field or have tools to join the workforce. For students entering post-secondary education or entering the workforce alike, the school offers a Specialist High Skills Major in Hospitality and Tourism. Through this program, students also obtain their SmartServe Certification, First-Aid Certification, Customer Service Certification, Food Safety Certification, and WHMIS Certification over the 11th and 12th grade Hospitality and Tourism courses.

Program highlights
Orchard Park Secondary School takes part in the following programs:
 Transitions Program
 Mentorship Program
 Drop-in resource centre
 In-School Alternative Education Program
 Off-Site Alternative Education Program
 Participation in Annual Stoney Creek Parades with school band
 2012 Anti-Cyber Bullying Campaign
 Technological Program – construction projects in the community
 FIRST Robotics Competition team.
 Annual Food Drives in support of Stoney Creek Food Bank
 STOP Program – Stop Tobacco at “OP” has received city and provincial recognition for their efforts in increasing awareness  about the problems of teenage smoking
 Co-op and volunteer placements in the community
 Guest speakers from the community

Clubs
Orchard Park Secondary School offers the following clubs:
 FIRST Robotics Competition Team 2056
 Students Council
 Students and Staff Helping Orchard Park Students and Society (S.S.H.O.P.S.S)
 Best Buddies
 Stop Tobacco at Orchard Park (S.T.O.P.)
 Tech Crew
 Justice and Equality Throughout Society (J.E.T.S.)
 Band
 Hockey
 Cross-Country (Co-ed)
 Basketball
 Football
 Water polo
 Reach for the Top
 Rugby
 Fastball (female)
  Anime/Video Game Club 
 Tennis
 Track and Field

Notable alumni
Corey Grant - CFL Player/Coach 
Bob Krouse - CFL Player for Hamilton Tiger Cats 
Donnie Ruiz, football player

See also
List of high schools in Ontario

References

External links
Orchard Park Secondary School profile
Orchard Park Secondary School

High schools in Hamilton, Ontario
Educational institutions established in 1966
1966 establishments in Ontario